Joseph Brummer (1883 – 14 April 1947) was a Hungarian-born art dealer and collector who exhibited both antique artifacts from different cultures, early European art, and the works of modern painters and sculptors in his galleries in Paris and New York. In 1906 he and his two brothers opened their first gallery in Paris, the Brummer Gallery. At the start of World War I, they closed the gallery and moved to New York City. Joseph alone opened his next gallery in 1921 in Manhattan.

Biography
Joseph (originally József) Brummer was born in Sombor, then in Hungary (now Serbia), in 1883. He studied applied arts in Szeged from 1897 on, and continued these studies in Budapest from 1899 on. Afterward, he studied at Munich before starting on his own as an artist in Budapest and Szeged.

Together with his brothers Ernest (1891-1964) and Imre (died 1928), he moved to Paris in 1905. In 1906, Brummer and his brothers opened the Brummer Gallery in Paris at the Boulevard Raspail, where they sold African art, Japanese prints and pre-Columbian, mainly Peruvian art, alongside contemporary paintings and sculptures.

During the autumn of 1908, he shared a studio space at Cité Falguière with avant-garde sculptor Joseph Csaky, who was also from Szeged and Budapest. Brummer studied sculpture under Jules-Felix Coutan, Auguste Rodin and in 1908 Henri Matisse. He also attended the Académie de la Grande Chaumière, and thus got to know contemporary artists.

At the start of World War I, Joseph Brummer closed in Paris and moved to New York City. In 1921 he reopened a gallery at 43 East Fifty-Seventh Street in Manhattan. He specialized in medieval and Renaissance European art, and Classical, Ancient Egyptian, African, and pre-Columbian objects, but also hosted some of the earliest exhibitions of modern European art in the United States. It stayed in business until 1949, two years after Joseph's death.

A major part of his private art collection was bought by the Metropolitan Museum of Art in 1947. A second part of the Joseph Brummer art collection, still over 2400 lots, was sold in 1949 by Parke-Bernet Galleries.

The final part, 600 pieces that remained in the family, were sold in Zurich in October 1979. These pieces were eventually inherited by Ernest Brummer's widow, Ella Bache Brummer. Their value was estimated at $10 million.

From 1931 until 1948, Brummer had owned the Guennol Lioness; in 2007 it was the most expensive sculpture ever sold at auction.

In 1909 Brummer had his portrait painted by Henri Rousseau. and by Anne Goldthwaite in 1915. In 1993, the Rousseau portrait was sold by Christie's for £2,971,500 ($4,421,592). It is currently owned by the National Gallery.

Gallery
The New York branch of the Brummer Gallery was opened in 1914 by Imre and Joseph Brummer. Joseph and his brothers Ernest were among the most significant art dealers of the first half of the 20th century, dealing in a broad range of art that spanned from classical antiquity to modern art. Their collection included many works from the Middle Ages, Pre-Columbian America, and Renaissance and Baroque decorative arts. Following Joseph Brummer's death in 1947, the gallery closed down in 1949, and its collection was auctioned off over the next three decades.

Exhibitions
This is an incomplete list of the exhibitions of modern art in the Brummer Gallery in New York.

1921, 4 to 23 April: Maurice Prendergast
1921, May: "Works by French and American artists including paintings by Jennie Van Fleet Cowdery", including two works by Auguste Renoir
1921, 24 October to 21 November: Anne Goldthwaite
1921, 28 November to 24 December: Frank Burty
1922, 3 to 21 January: Peggy Bacon and Alexander Brook
1922: sculptures by Henri Matisse and Manolo Hugué, and paintings by Amedeo Modigliani, André Derain, Maurice Utrillo, Marie Laurencin and Pascin
1922 December 15 to 1923, 13 January: Auguste Rodin (paintings and sculptures)
1923: 17 January to 10 February: Pascin
1923, 17 March to 14 April: Thomas Eakins
1923: Bernard Karfiol
1923, 22 October to 10 November: Toshi Shimizu
1923, 15 December to 1924, 5 January: Works by Max Jacob
1924, 25 February to 22 March: Henri Matisse
1924: Hermine David
1924: José de Togores
1924, 4 to 27 December: Georges Seurat
1925, January: Roger Fry
1925, February: Walter Pach
1925, 2 to 21 March 1925: Michel Kikoine
1925: Bernard Karfiol (second exhibition at Brummer)
1926, 18 January to 13 February: Aristide Maillol
1926, 17 November to 15 December: Sculptures by Constantin Brâncuși.
1927, 17 January to 12 February: Béla Czóbel
1927, 14 February to 12 March: Bernard Karfiol (third exhibition at Brummer)
1927, March to 9 April: Eugène Zak
1927, late: First personal exhibition of works by Charles Despiau
1928, 1 to 25 February: John Storrs
1928, 27 February to 24 March: Gaston Lachaise
1928, 26 March to 21 April: Jacques Villon, paintings
1929, 16 February to 16 March: A. S. Baylinson and Morris Kantor
1929, 18 March to 13 April: Jane Berlandina
1929, 28 March to 12 April: Raymond Duchamp-Villon, sculptures
1929, May: Michel Kikoine (second exhibition at Brummer)
1929, 1 to 28 November: "Portraits of Maria Lani by Fifty-One Painters", featuring work by Chaïm Soutine, Kees van Dongen, Georges Rouault, Pierre Bonnard, Rodolphe-Théophile Bosshard, Charles Despiau, Henri Matisse, Man Ray, André Derain, and others
1929, 30 November to 13 December: collection of Albert Eugene Gallatin, including work by Fernand Léger, Man Ray, Paul Klee, André Masson, Joan Miró, Joseph Stella, and a 1906 self-portrait by Pablo Picasso
1929, 14 December to 1930, 31 January: Othon Friesz, Paintings
1930, 1 to 28 February: Max Jacob (second exhibition at Brummer)
1930, 8 to 31 March: Jane Berlandina (second exhibition at Brummer)
1930, 1 April to 3 May: Georges Rouault
1930, 20 October to 20 November: Jacques Villon (second exhibition at Brummer)
1930, 22 November to 20 December: Pierre Roy
1931, 5 January to 7 February: Henri Matisse, sculptures
1931, 13 to 28 February: Anne Goldthwaite (second exhibition at Brummer)
1931, 16 March to 18 April: Théophile Steinlen
1931, 13 October to 7 November: Marcel Mouillot
1931, 9 November to ?: Charles Dufresne
1932, 9 to 29 February: Arthur Everett Austin, Jr.
1932, 5 March to 5 April: Josep Llorens i Artigas
1932, November to 10 December: Maurice Marinot, glass
1932, 13 December to ?: 18th century French drawings, from the Richard Owen collection
1933, 3 January to 28 February: Aristide Maillol (second exhibition at Brummer)
1933, 4 March to 15 April: Pierre Roy (second exhibition at Brummer)
1933, October to November: 18th and 19th century French drawings from the Richard Owen collection (second part), including works by Antoine Watteau, Gustave Moreau and Théophile Steinlen
1933, 17 November to 1934, 13 January: Sculptures by Constantin Brâncuși (second exhibition at Brummer).
1934, 24 February to 15 April: Pablo Gargallo
1934, 5 November to 29 December: Charles Despiau (second exhibition at Brummer)
1935, 5 January to 28 February: André Dunoyer de Segonzac
1935, 15 March to 11 May: Mateo Hernandez
1935, October: Marguerite Zorach
1935, 2 December to 1936, 31 January: first US exhibition of Jacques Lipchitz
1936, 2 March to 4 April: Béla Czóbel
1936, 9 November to 1937, 2 January: André Derain
1937, 25 January to 20 March: Ossip Zadkine
1937, 1 November to 31 December: François Pompon
1938, February and March: Léon Hartl
1938, 7 to 28 November: Charles Dufresne (second Brummer exhibition)
1938: 7 November to 1939, 7 January: Henri Laurens

Notes

Further reading

External links
The Brummer Gallery Records, over 13,000 digitized object cards from The Metropolitan Museum of Art Libraries
Walters Art Museum objects with provenance from Joseph Brummer
Metropolitan Museum of Art objects with provenance from Joseph Brummer
The Frick Collection research information
Article on The Brummer Gallery Records from The Metropolitan Museum of Art Libraries.
Documenting the Gilded Age: New York City Exhibitions at the Turn of the 20th Century. A New York Art Resources Consortium project. Brummer Gallery exhibition catalogs.
Oral history interview with Dr. John Laszlo, 2015 Dec. 6 from The Metropolitan Museum of Art Archives, New York.

1883 births
1947 deaths
People from Sombor
Hungarian emigrants to France
French emigrants to the United States
Hungarian art dealers
American art dealers
Hungarian art collectors
American art collectors